Señor Smoke (2005) is the second album from Electric Six, following Fire in 2003.  It was released in the UK February 14, 2005 by Warner Music imprint Rushmore Records. Due to complications with Electric Six's former record label, Rushmore did not release the album in North America. In December 2005, the band announced a new partnership with Metropolis Records that resulted in Señor Smoke'''s North American release on February 7, 2006.Señor Smoke was ravaged by the UK press upon its 2005 release. However, the response to the album has been much more enthusiastic in America, with several positive reviews, including one from the March 2006 issue of Blender'' Magazine that claims that the album (which received four stars) is so good that "[it] achieves an advance modern medicine has long pursued: it restores virginity."

Track listing
All lyrics written by Tyler Spencer except "Radio Ga Ga" by Roger Taylor; all music composed by Tyler Spencer except where noted.
"Rock and Roll Evacuation" (3:36)
"Devil Nights" (Spencer/Zach Shipps/Christopher Tait/Chris Peters) (2:56)
"Bite Me" (Spencer/Shipps/Tait/Peters) (3:57)
"Jimmy Carter" (3:27)
"Pleasing Interlude I" (0:47)
"Dance Epidemic" (Spencer/Shipps/Tait/Peters) (2:48)
"Future Boys" (3:08)
"Dance-A-Thon 2005" (Spencer/Shipps/Tait/Peters) (3:29)
"Dark Angel" (3:17)
"Vibrator" (Spencer/Shipps/Tait/Peters) (2:31)
"Boy Or Girl?" (Spencer/Shipps/Tait/Peters) (3:26)
"Pleasing Interlude II" (0:27)
"Radio Ga Ga" (Taylor) (3:55)
"Taxi to Nowhere" (1:39)
"Future Is in the Future" (Spencer/Shipps/Tait/Peters) (3:37)

Personnel
 Dick Valentine - vocals
  - lead guitar
 The Colonel - rhythm guitar
 Tait Nucleus? - synthesizer
 John R. Dequindre - bass (tracks 1-12, 14-15)
 Frank Lloyd Bonaventure - bass (track 13)
 Matt Aljian - drums (tracks 1-4, 7-9, 12, 15)
 Michael Alonso - drums (tracks 6, 10)
 Johnny Hentch - piano (tracks 1, 14)

Trivia
 The album's title honors Aurelio López (1948-1992), a former relief pitcher of the Detroit Tigers whose nickname was Señor Smoke.
 "Vibrator" was released as a free download-only single on the 18th of October 2004 to help promote the album. This was later revealed to be a "Download Mix" as opposed to the album version.
 The song "Bite Me" borrows the line "[I] have accountants pay for it all" from the Joe Walsh song, "Life's Been Good".
 The song "Jimmy Carter" borrows the line "Backstreet's back alright" from "Everybody" by Backstreet Boys.
 The song "Dance-A-Thon 2005" was retired from the band's live performances after 2005, however it returned in 2009 with the words changed to "Dance-A-Thon 2009".
 The song "Dance-A-Thon 2005" reprises the lines "I want to reach into the fire of your heart, I want to program all those beats right from the start, have you ever been to New York City? New York City!" from "Improper Dancing", a song on Electric Six's previous album "Fire".
 The song "Taxi to Nowhere" originated from the band's days as "The Wildbunch".

Legacy
Demos recorded for the album, "Strike While the Iron Is Hot!", "Turn It Up!", "Telephone Conversation", "Serious Help", "Future Police", "Living on the Sexy Planet", "Be My Dark Angel (Demo)", "Devil Nights (Demo)", "Another Song About the Devil", "Self Destruct", "Bite Me (Demo)", "Stepsister", "Filthy Blankets", "I'm on a Diet", "People Like You (Don't Like People Like Me)" and "The World's Smallest Human Being" were subsequently released on the band's first compilation album "Sexy Trash".

"Dance Epidemic" and "Future Is in the Future" were performed on the band's first live album "Absolute Pleasure".

"Devil Nights", "Dance Epidemic" and "Future Is in the Future" were performed in their live concert film "Absolute Treasure".

A live performance of "Dance Epidemic" from the band's XFM sessions as well as further demos intended for the album, "The Sheik Don't Lie" and "Taxi 2 Nowhere (Demo)" were subsequently released on the band's second compilation album "Mimicry and Memories".

"Rock and Roll Evacuation" and "Future Boys" were performed on the band's second live album "You're Welcome!".

A stripped down, acoustic version of "Jimmy Carter" was performed for the band's upcoming third live album "Chill Out!".

References

External links
 Radio Ga Ga music video on YouTube

2005 albums
Electric Six albums